Pseudestoloides is a genus of longhorn beetles of the subfamily Lamiinae, containing the following species:

 Pseudestoloides affinis Martins & Galileo, 2009
Pseudestoloides bingkirki Santos-Silva, Wappes & Galileo, 2018
 Pseudestoloides costaricensis Breuning & Heyrovsky, 1961
 Pseudestoloides hiekei Breuning, 1974
 Pseudestoloides rubiginosa Martins & Galileo, 2009

References

Desmiphorini